Amy Wilson (born 9 June 1980) is a former female Australian football midfielder.

She was part of the Australia women's national soccer team  at the 2000 Summer Olympics. She retired in 2014.

See also
 Australia at the 2000 Summer Olympics

References

External links
 
 

1980 births
Living people
Australian women's soccer players
Place of birth missing (living people)
Footballers at the 2000 Summer Olympics
Olympic soccer players of Australia
Women's association football midfielders
1999 FIFA Women's World Cup players
2003 FIFA Women's World Cup players
Australia women's international soccer players